Solo show may refer to:

 Solo performance, a single person telling a story to entertain an audience
 Solo exhibition, a display of the work of only one artist